La Maison de la Magie Robert-Houdin (French for "The Robert-Houdin House of Magic") is a museum which faces the Royal Château de Blois.  It is located in the Loir-et-Cher département in the Loire Valley, in France, in the center of the city of Blois. As a museum of France and bearing the official label of "Musée de France", it is the only public museum in Europe which incorporates in one place collections of magic and a site for permanent performing arts. The creation of such a site is directly linked to the personality of Jean-Eugène Robert-Houdin, a famous French illusionist born in Blois in 1805.

History
Inaugurated in 1998, the museum highlights the life and work of Robert-Houdin—multi-talented illusionist, prestidigitator, inventor, clockmaker and maker of automatons.

In 1981, descendants of Jean Eugène Robert-Houdin left to the city of Blois the building and all its accessories with a gift requiring they be exposed to the public.  170 objects that were constructed or collected by Robert-Houdin are in the museum.

The museum hosts a number of events, some of which recur.  The include: exhibition of portraits of the greatest magicians; magical encounters (on weekends in July and August); lectures on Jean Eugène Robert-Houdin; evening shows; proceedings of 'the Gala magic clubs of Blois'; and awards to the best magical practitioners.

Guided tours are conducted by illusionists.

Attractions
Highlights include: The six-headed dragon automaton, which was constructed by artists Michel and Jean-Pierre Hartmann and which operates every half-hour; the rotunda, which contains artifacts and displays on the history of magic, pictures and music; the Greek temple honoring jugglers of the Middle Ages, the physicist Pinetti (eighteenth century magician Joseph Pinetti Willedall de Merci), and genius inventor Buatier De Kolta;  a life-sized kaleidoscope and the 'chessboard of the optical illusions'; an exposition of "The firm of Robert-Houdin fantastic" (Level 1), displaying his watchmaking workshop, scientific research (in optics and electricity) magical craft and 'the mysterious clock'. On Level 3, the "hallucinoscope" ("brainchild" of Gerard Majax) immerses the participant into the world of Jules Verne and 20,000 Leagues under the Sea.

Another area is the "Georges Méliès space", which honors him as a magician and as the father of film special effects.

Magic shows are conducted daily, and the building is open daily during the tourist season.

See also
List of magic museums

Notes

External links
 Blois, Le Pays de Chambord, Maison de la Magie.
 Gutenberg collection: links to archive images on the subject of magic including Robert-Houdin and Harry Houdini collections.
 Harry Houdini collection list with links including images relating to Robert-Houdin

Animatronic attractions
Biographical museums in France
Museums in Loir-et-Cher
Magic museums
Organizations established in 1998
Performing arts museums
Blois